Throughout its history of publication, Marvel Comics has produced many intercompany crossover stories combining characters from different series. The following is a list of crossover events involving superheroes and characters from different series.

Line-wide events 

Secret Wars was the first modern Marvel event where a separate limited series was launched and then all other tie–ins followed from that. After its release, Marvel started having annual crossovers events where a mini–series was launched for the event and it impacted most Marvel comic books.

1990s

The Infinity Trilogy is a three–event arc about the Infinity Gems. Part 2 (Infinity War) and Part 3 (Infinity Crusade) deal with the fallout of the Infinity Gauntlet: the creation of separate parts of cosmic hero Adam Warlock, Goddess and Magus.

2000s

2010s

2020s

Major events/storylines

1960s

1970s

1980s

1990s

2000s

2010s

2020s

Avengers crossovers/storylines

1970s

1980s

1990s

2000s

2010s
{| class="wikitable"
!width=25%|  Event
!width=5%|  Date
!width=8%|  Type
!width=65%|  Developments
|-
|Avengers: The Children's Crusade' 
| July 2010–March 2012 
| Limited Series
| Helmed by Allan Heinberg and Jimmy Cheung, the mini-series leads to the return of Scarlet Witch, who is sought after by different parties, for their own interests: the Avengers, Young Avengers, Magneto and Doctor Doom.
|-
| Avengers: X–Sanction|December 2011–March 2012
| Limited Series
|This is set up for Avengers vs. X–Men event.
|-
|Avengers Origins
|January 2012
|One–Shots
|Marvel comics present the origins of the Avengers
|-
|End Times
|October–November 2012
| Story Series
|After Avengers vs. X–men, an Emergency Signal leads the Avengers to the Microverse, where they find a safe and sound Janet van Dyne (Wasp). Meanwhile, Daniel Drumm (Brother Voodoo) enacts his revenge for his brother's death. 
|-
|Avengers Arena
|  December 2012–November 2013
| Limited Series
| Part of the Marvel NOW!. Long–term Marvel villain, Arcade put 16 teenage heroes in a Battle Royale–style survival competition on a new, deadlier Murderworld. Avengers Undercover : sequel and aftermath to the preceding storyline, showing what happened to the surviving teens from Murderworld. Part of the "All–New Marvel NOW!
|-
|Age of Ultron 
| March–June 2013 
| Event
| For years, Marvel Heroes feared that Hank Pym's artificial intelligence Ultron will one day return and exterminate everything. That day has come, and the fate of the world now rests in the hands of Wolverine and Invisible Woman. 
|-
|The Enemy Within 
|May–July 2013
| Crossover
|Vicious echoes of the Avengers’ past are cropping up all over Manhattan... and a grounded Captain Marvel refuses to be left behind.Who is the sinister figure behind these incursions and what does it have to do with Carol Danvers’ mysterious condition?
|-
|Original Sin 
|April–October 2014 
| Event
|The Watcher has been murdered. Now it is up to Marvel Universe heroes to find the killer. Many secrets hidden from heroes will be revealed that will have many ramifications on a lot of them
|-
|Time Runs Out 
| September 2014–April 2015 
| Crossover
|In September 2014 Avengers #34 and #35 time jump ahead by 8 months where it's said (via Bleeding Cool): Time Runs Out sees everything Jonathan Hickman has been building towards comes to a close and will affect the entire Marvel company across the board, forcing them to do something the company has never done in its 75 years, rebooting the Marvel Universe.  Though the series is restricted to the two titles, Avengers World  will have a storyline called Before Time Runs Out to help catch up readers with how the events of Time Runs Out happened.  The Time Runs Out event is a direct prelude to Secret Wars.
|-
|Ultron Forever 
|April–May 2015
|One–Shots
|A group of Avengers one–shots published in the Spring of 2015 and presented here in order of release these comics
|-
| Avengers: Rage of Ultron|April 2015
| One–Shot
|After the event of "Age of Ultron" the Avenger Defeat Ultron and never to be seen again. Or so they thought. Now, years later, the homicidal artificial intelligence–so long devoted to ending life on Earth–has found a new world to conquer, one with its own horrific legacy. When Titan, birthplace of Thanos, falls, Planet Ultron rises in its place! Thanos' brother Starfox must seek the aid of his former allies–but the Avengers he finds are radically different from the ones he once knew. Among them is Ultron's creator Giant–Man–and when Hank Pym confronts his now planet–sized "son," the responsibilities of fatherhood have never loomed so large. Rick Remender (UNCANNY AVENGERS) and Jerome Opeña (AVENGERS) unleash the full robotic rage of Ultron on Earth's Mightiest Heroes!
|-
|Avengers (2015)
|October 2015
|One–Shot Series Release  
|After Secret Wars event, this One–shot is part of All–New, All–Different Marvel that released the series:  New Avengers Vol 4, Squadron Supreme vol 4, Uncanny Avengers Vol 3, A–Force Vol 2, Ultimates Vol 2, All–New, All–Different Avengers vol 1, Scalet Witch vol 2 and Vision vol 2.
|-
|Avengers: Standoff! 
|March–April 2016 
| Stories Series 
| To celebrate Captain America's 75th anniversary, the Avengers will find themselves in what looks like any other remote small town known as Pleasant Hill, only this gated community holds a dark and sinister secret–one that keeps its residents locked away behind its walls. Now, the time has come for its townsfolk to finally escape. As their revolt begins–why then are the Avengers trying to keep them inside?! And what does it have to do with S.H.I.E.L.D.? Even Earth's Mightiest Heroes won't be prepared for the truth behind Pleasant Hill. The event begins with a one–shot issue Avengers Standoff: Assault on Pleasant Hill Alpha (in February there will be a prelude called Avengers Standoff: Welcome to Pleasant Hill #1) and will continue through Avengers family titles.
|-
|Worlds Collide|October–December 2017
|Crossover
|Following the events of Generations comes the long–promised clash between the Avengers and the Champions. The countdown has started as the High Evolutionary, a twisted scientist determined to create a better world at all costs, sets the Earth on a collision course with destruction! The Avengers and the Champions are ready to meet this threat — but will their first cataclysmic clash deter them from Changing the World?
|-
|Avengers: No Surrender 
|January–April 2018
|Story Series
|When the Earth is taken by mysterious forces, the planet's only hope is the Avengers, Avengers Unity Division, the U.S.Avengers, and the mysterious Voyager, who claims to be an original member of the Avengers.Fresh Start: The relaunch saw the return of Tony Stark, Steve Rogers, Logan, Odinson and Bruce Banner to their classic identities of Iron Man, Captain America, Wolverine, Thor and Hulk respectively. All those characters had been replaced by legacy heroes in recent times.Avengers: No Road Home: The team that brought you AVENGERS: NO SURRENDER REUNITES for an all–new weekly AVENGERS adventure! Night has fallen across the universe. Now seven Avengers — and one new addition — journey forth to bring back the light. But when the threat they face has destroyed even the gods... will anyone make it home?
|-
|Avengers World Tour
|September–December 2018
|Story Series
|After defeated Loki and the Celestials, earth's mightiest heroes have a new headquarter Avengers Mountain but dealing with an old friend
|-
|Avengers: Back To Basics 
|March–May 2018
|Limited Series
|Darkness is coming, and with it, a terrible and ancient danger. Can Earth's Mightiest Heroes avert Ragnarok, or will the servants of death prove triumphant?
|}

2020s

 X-Men crossovers/storylines 
As X–Men popularity grew in the 1980s, Marvel started doing crossovers between X–Men books, usually dubbed X–Overs''.

1980s

1990s

2000s

2010s

2020s

Spider-Man crossovers/storylines

1970s

1980s

1990s

2000s

2010s

2020s

Marvel 2099

Ultimate Marvel

Intercompany Crossovers

See also
 List of What If issues
 Marvel Cinematic Universe tie–in comics
 Marvel Mangaverse

References

External links 

An unofficial list of Marvel events, crossovers, and other major storylines

Comic book publication histories
Marvel Comics storylines